The Johnstown flood of 1977 was a major flood which began on the night of July 19, 1977, when heavy rainfall caused widespread flash flooding in Cambria County, Pennsylvania, United States, including the city of Johnstown and the Conemaugh Valley.

On July 19, 1977, a deluge of rain hit the area around Johnstown during the night. Nearly  of rain fell in 24 hours when a thunderstorm stalled over the area, and six dams in the area over-topped and failed. The combination of the other five dams released another , not counting the water from rains. Ron Shawley, executive director of Laurel Highland's Historical Village, returned to Johnstown on July 20 and stated "It was like somebody dropped an atomic bomb on Johnstown" and that "I questioned what kind of force it would take to do that."

History

Johnstown
A Swiss immigrant named Joseph Schantz started farming at the confluence of the Little Conemaugh River and the Stoneycreek River around 1794. He laid out plans for a town and chose the name Conemaugh after a Native American village that occupied the same site. The plan accounted for the fact that a new county named Cambria would be taken from Somerset County but lobbying for the new town to be the county seat failed as Ebensburg was chosen. The town was situated within the Conemaugh River sub-basin (Ohio River Basin) and was prone to flooding.

Response to earlier floods
Despite the devastation of the flood of 1889, no significant flood measures were undertaken. In 1936, Congress was debating flood control bills. During this time, heavy snow run-off and three days of continuous rainfall caused the Saint Patrick's Day flood of 1936. On April 27, 1937, Congress passed sweeping flood control legislation and in 1938 work began. On November 27, 1943, the Johnstown Channel Improvement Project was completed, with 9.1 miles (14.6 km) of improvements that included the Conemaugh River, Stony Creek, and the Little Conemaugh River.

After the Johnstown flood of 1936, the U.S. Army Corps of Engineers undertook a study with the aim of redesigning Johnstown's infrastructure to permanently remove any future threat of serious flooding. Work began in August 1938 with extensive dredging and flood control measures. On November 27, 1943, Colonel Gilbert Van B. Wilkes, Chief of the Army Corps of Engineers, Pittsburgh District, told a Johnstown audience the flood problems had been effectively solved. The city's residents began to feel secure that any flooding issues had been resolved and even promoted the area as "flood free" for many years. However, the Corps of Engineers had designed the flood control measures for protection against a standard project flood; protection to the 500-year level was not economically viable. In 1974, the Corps issued a report titled "The Potential for Future Flooding in the Johnstown Area", which failed to grasp the attentions of town leaders and the people of Johnstown.

Dam failures

The Laurel Run Dam on Laurel Run was an old earthen dam owned by the Bethlehem Steel company and sold to the Johnstown Water Company. After the dam failed, water rushed through the Tanneryville neighborhood. When the dam failed the flood waters entered the Conemaugh between St. Michael and South Fork at Ehrenfeld. The Salix Water Dam on Otto Run, owned by the Adams Township Water Authority, was a  earthen dam that held  of water. When the dam failed, the flood waters ran into the South Fork Little Conemaugh River which joins the Conemaugh River in Sidman. Sanders Run flows adjacent to and joins Howells Run, skirting Ebensburg draining into City Reservoir. The dam was a total failure. An unnamed dam on Peggy's Run, Franklin Borough, was leased to Bethlehem Mines Corporation. The dam was situated outside Franklin and the water shed drained towards East Conemaugh and the Conemaugh River. The dam failure released an unknown amount of water. An unnamed impoundment dam, holding  of reserve water for Bethlehem Mines Corporation, also failed.

The victims of the 1977 flooding were from Old Conemaugh Borough (2), Hornerstown (4), Walnut Grove (3), West End (1), Dale Borough (10), Seward (7), Strongstown (1), Tanneryville (39 including those still missing), Windber, (2), Summerhill (1), Dilltown (1), Dunlo (3), Mineral Point (2), Richland (6), and Scalp Level (2)

Impact on local economy 
Johnstown, a once booming steel city was significantly impacted by the aftermath of flood. In a city that relied so heavily on the steel industry in its economy, the effects of this disaster would be felt for some years to come. The Bethlehem Steel Company had roots into the industry within Johnstown. As the company continued to face a decline in profits in the years after the flood, they looked to Johnstown for solutions. With continuous cutbacks, Johnstown had ranked as the area with the least profit made. Over 2,300 steel jobs were terminated in Johnstown as a part of cutbacks by CEO of Bethlehem Steel, Donald Trautlein, who succeeded Lewis Foy as Bethlehem Steel's CEO in 1980. He invested no more money into the city as he did not see any more profit to be made.

See also
 Johnstown flood of 1936
 Canal inclined plane
 Inclined plane railroad

References

External links

 Johnstown Flood Museum – Johnstown Area Heritage Association
 The water supply of Johnstown

1977 in Pennsylvania
1977 natural disasters in the United States
1977 meteorology
Disasters in Pennsylvania
Dam failures in the United States
Johnstown, Pennsylvania
July 1977 events in the United States
Floods in Pennsylvania